The Skydive Chicago Resort is a skydiving resort and camping ground in Ottawa, Illinois in the United States. It operates a private airport, Skydive Chicago Airport, and offers indoor and outdoor skydiving, along with camping, RV parking, an observation area and restaurant, and an auditorium. The airport is located on the Illinois River. The resort claims to operate the largest fleet of skydiving aircraft in the midwestern United States.

The facility closed during the COVID-19 pandemic, but has since reopened.

Notable events
The resort hosted the 2016 World Championships of Skydiving. The airport has also hosted a number of U.S. national championships, most recently in 2022. It is also home to World VFS and National Silver FS medalist teams.

The resort was the home of a 200-person "head-down vertical" skydiving jump in an attempt to break a world record by completing the largest single-point skydive ever. Jumpers climbed up to 19,000 feet before jumping out of the planes, locking arms, and holding the position before separating to pull their parachutes. The attempt was eventually cut down to 170 in hopes it would make the world record easier to accomplish.

Accidents
The center has had several accidents in its history. In 2002, it was found that the facility's death rate that year was eight times higher than the national average. 13 deaths occurred between 1993 and 2002 at the facility, with some experts saying that flights at the airport cause collision hazards for aircraft into nearby O'Hare and Midway airports. In 2022, a skydiver was found dead in a cornfield near the facility, though investigators concluded the death was not related to the world record attempt going on at the time. At least 18 deaths have occurred in total there.

References

External links 

Parachuting in the United States
Campgrounds in Illinois
Tourist attractions in LaSalle County, Illinois
Ottawa, Illinois